Live From Austin, TX is a live album by indie band Guided by Voices, recorded on November 9, 2004 and released by New West Records.

Track listing

Disc One

 "Demons Are Real" - 1:39
 "Pimple Zoo" - 1:33
 "Everybody Thinks I'm a Raincloud (When I'm Not Looking)" - 3:27
 "Exit Flagger" - 2:14
 "Sleep Over Jack" - 3:00
 "Girls of Wild Strawberries" - 2:33
 "Navigating Flood Regions" - 2:46
 "Gold Star for Robot Boy" - 1:58
 "Window of My World" - 3:08
 "Redmen and Their Wives" - 4:06
 "Dayton, Ohio - 19 Something and 5" - 2:11
 "My Impression Now" - 2:23
 "Do the Earth" - 3:22
 "Game of Pricks" - 2:23
 "Secret Star" - 7:31

Disc Two

 "My Kind of Soldier" - 3:29
 "Sad if I Lost It" - 3:33
 "Cut Out Witch" - 3:33
 "Gonna Never Have to Die" - 2:32
 "Best of Jill Hives" - 2:50
 "Watch Me Jumpstart" - 2:51
 "Tractor Rape Chain" - 2:56
 "Buzzards and Dreadful Crows" - 1:57
 "Pendulum" - 2:03
 "Murder Charge" - 2:53
 "Fair Touching" - 3:33
 "Teenage FBI" - 2:57
 "Glad Girls" - 3:59
 "I Am a Scientist" - 2:48
 "Echos Myron" - 2:44

2004 live albums
New West Records live albums
Guided by Voices albums